Jang Seong-woo (born January 17, 1990) is the catcher of KT Wiz of the KBO League. He joined Lotte Giants in 2008. After that, he belonged to Korean Police Baseball Team in 2012, and he moved to Lotte Giants again in 2014. Then he moved to KT Wiz in 2015. He won the most RBI in the North Korean league in the Yakult Seven Pro Baseball Futures League in 2013. He graduated Kyungnam High school.

Controversy 
After the 2015 season, his ex-girlfriend revealed his personal life, saying that Park Ki-ryang, a cheerleader for the Lotte Giants, was suing him and had no intention of reaching an agreement. 

In the end, the club suspended him for 50 games and disciplined him for his volunteer work, making him unable to play in the early part of the 2016 season. In addition, back pain remained, so he ended the season without making it to the first division in 2016.

References

External links 
 Sung-Woo Jang on Baseball Reference

Living people
KT Wiz players
Baseball catchers
1990 births
North Shore Honu players
South Korean expatriate baseball players in the United States
Lotte Giants players
Canberra Cavalry players
South Korean expatriate baseball players in Australia
Sportspeople from Busan